Sex, Violence, and the Avant-Garde: Anarchism in Interwar France is a 2010 history book by Richard D. Sonn.

References

External links 

 

2010 non-fiction books
English-language books
Penn State University Press books
History books about anarchism
Anarchism in France